William or Bill Meyer may refer to:

Politics
 William H. Meyer (Colorado politician) (1847–1923), Lieutenant Governor of Colorado
 William H. Meyer (1914–1983), member of the U.S. House of Representatives
 William Stevenson Meyer (1860–1922), ICS officer and first High Commissioner for India

Sports
 William Meyer (cricketer) (1883–1953), English cricketer
 Bill Meyer (basketball) (1943–2018), American basketball player
 Bill Meyer (water polo) (born 1958), Canadian water polo player
 Billy Meyer (1893–1957), American baseball player

Other
 William Meyer (Medal of Honor) (1863–1926), U.S. Navy sailor and Medal of Honor recipient
 Bill Meyer (artist) (born 1942), Australian artist

See also
 William Mayer (disambiguation)
 William Meyers (1943–2014), South African boxer
 William Myers (disambiguation)
 Billy Meier
 Billmeyer, a German surname